Vimal may refer to:

People
Vimal (name)
Vimal (actor), Indian actor in Tamil films

Education
Vimal Jyothi Engineering College, Kerala, India
Vimal Singh Mahavidyalay, Uttar Pradesh, India